Daniele Caroli (born 10 January 1959) is an Italian former professional racing cyclist. He rode in one edition of the Tour de France, three editions of the Giro d'Italia and one edition of the Vuelta a España.

References

External links
 

1959 births
Living people
Italian male cyclists
People from Faenza
Cyclists from Emilia-Romagna
Sportspeople from the Province of Ravenna